Zion Digmi  (born ) is a former Israeli footballer. He competed in the men's tournament at the 1968 Summer Olympics.

References

External links
 
 

1942 births
Living people
Israeli footballers
Footballers from Jaffa
Maccabi Jaffa F.C. players
Hapoel Ramat Gan F.C. players
Shimshon Tel Aviv F.C. players
Liga Leumit players
Israel international footballers
Footballers at the 1968 Summer Olympics
Olympic footballers of Israel
Iraqi emigrants to Israel
Association football goalkeepers